Oļegs Timofejevs (born 28 November 1988) is a Latvian football defender, who last played Riga FC in the Latvian Higher League.

Club career
Since December 2015, he is on trial with Czech Synot liga side FC Zbrojovka Brno.

Honours

FK Ventspils
 Latvian champion
 2013, 2014

References

External links
 
 profile on Latvian Football Federation
 

1988 births
Living people
Sportspeople from Daugavpils
Latvian footballers
Latvia international footballers
Dinaburg FC players
FK Ventspils players
FK Liepājas Metalurgs players
Association football midfielders